The Qatar national handball team is controlled by the Qatar Handball Association and take part in international handball competitions. 

Qatar holds the distinction of being the only non-European side to reach the final of the Men’s World Handball Championship, when they finished as runners-up at the 2015 edition, losing to France on home soil.

Honours
 Asian Men's Handball Championship:
Winners: 2014, 2016, 2018, 2020, 2022

 Asian Games:
Winners: 2014, 2018

Results

Summer Olympics
 2016 – 8th place

World Championship
 2003 – 16th place
 2005 – 21st place
 2007 – 23rd place
 2013 – 20th place
 2015 – 2nd place
 2017 – 8th place
 2019 – 13th place
 2021 – 8th place
 2023 – 22nd place

Asian Championship
 1983 – 6th place
 1987 – 6th place
 1989 – 6th place
 1991 – 4th place
 1993 – 7th place
 2002 – 2nd place
 2004 – 3rd place
 2006 – 3rd place
 2008 – 5th place
 2010 – 5th place
 2012 – 2nd place
 2014 – 1st place
 2016 – 1st place
 2018 – 1st place
 2020 – 1st place
 2022 – 1st place

Partners
Qatar Insurance
QNB Group
Ooredoo
Ooredoo Q.P.S.C.
beIN Media Group
beIN Sports
Alkass Sports Channels
Visit Qatar
Qatar Airways
Hamad International Airport
Qatar Television
Alrayyan TV
Al Jazeera

Current squad
Squad for the 2023 World Men's Handball Championship.

Head coach: Valero Rivera López

Controversy

Player naturalisation
The Qatari national team naturalized a large number of foreign players to their squad for the 2015 World Men's Handball Championship.

According to IHF rules, to gain eligibility for a new national team, a player cannot have played for another nation for three years in an official match. This allowed several foreign-born players, including Spanish-born Borja Vidal, Goran Stojanović and Jovo Damjanović from Montenegro, and Bertrand Roiné who previously played for France, to play for the Qatar team at the championship.

Head of the Qatar Handball Federation, Ahmed Mohammed Abdulrab Al Shaabi, acknowledged the policy in a statement in June 2013, saying "We're a small nation with limited human resources, so we had to bring players from outside in the past." He also announced an end to the policy at the time, adding however that they "[might] make an exception only in the case of an experienced goalkeeper." In January 2014, Danish sports agent Mads Winther said he had met with "contacts involved with Qatar" regarding the possibility of naturalising Danish players.

The practice was criticised by Austrian goalkeeper Thomas Bauer after his team's loss to Qatar in the quarter-final, saying "It [felt] like playing against a world selection team" and "I think it is not the sense of a world championship." At a press conference during the championship, Qatar head coach Valero Rivera declined to comment on the matter. Spanish player Joan Cañellas did not think it was an issue, saying "If they can do it, why not."

After the controversial semi-final against Poland, and reaching the final as a result, the practice was even more criticised, with players such as Danijel Šarić having now represented four different national teams.

Paid fans
Qatar flew in about 60 Spanish fans to cheer for Qatar during the 2015 World Championship.

Refereeing favouritism
The referees were widely accused of being one-sided in favour of Qatar during its biggest success, 2nd place in the 2015 World Championship. Especially at the last-16 encounter against Austria, the quarterfinal against Germany and the semi-final against Poland. After the final whistle, the Polish players showed their disgust by sarcastically applauding the three referees.

References

External links

IHF profile

Handball in Qatar
Men's national handball teams
Handball